The Book of Boba Fett is an American space Western television mini-series created by Jon Favreau for the streaming service Disney+. It is part of the Star Wars franchise and a spin-off from the series The Mandalorian, taking place in the same timeframe as that series and its other interconnected spin-offs after the events of Return of the Jedi (1983). The Book of Boba Fett follows bounty hunter Boba Fett from The Mandalorian and other Star Wars media as he establishes himself as the new crime lord of Jabba the Hutt's former territory.

Temuera Morrison stars as the title character, with Ming-Na Wen and Pedro Pascal also starring. All reprise their roles from The Mandalorian and other Star Wars media. A standalone Star Wars film centered on Boba Fett was in early development at Lucasfilm before the company began prioritizing streaming series such as The Mandalorian. A potential spin-off series was first reported in November 2020 and was officially announced in December. Filming had begun by that point and lasted until June 2021. In addition to Favreau, Dave Filoni, Kathleen Kennedy, and Colin Wilson return from The Mandalorian as executive producers and are joined by Robert Rodriguez, who directed three episodes.

The Book of Boba Fett premiered on December 29, 2021, and ran for seven episodes until February 9, 2022. The series received mixed reviews from critics who praised the performances of Morrison and Wen but criticized the writing and the characterization of Boba Fett.

Premise 
Boba Fett and Fennec Shand attempt to make a name for themselves in the galaxy's underworld by taking over the territory once controlled by Jabba the Hutt.

Cast and characters

Starring 
 Temuera Morrison as Boba Fett:The newest "Daimyo" of Tatooine, a former bounty hunter, and clone of his father Jango Fett. Morrison said the series was an opportunity to explore the character's past and show what happened to him between the events of Return of the Jedi (1983) and the second season of The Mandalorian (2020). He focused on Fett's "simmering kind of violence" and desire for revenge, as well as his loneliness, that was caused by watching his father die at a young age. This plays into the idea that he finds a new family in a tribe of Tusken Raiders in The Book of Boba Fett. Archive footage of Daniel Logan as a young Fett filmed for Star Wars: Episode II – Attack of the Clones (2002) was used, while Finnegan Garay served as the on-set actor for young Fett. Morrison also voices the clone troopers in Grogu's Order 66 flashback.
 Ming-Na Wen as Fennec Shand: An elite mercenary and assassin in Fett's service.
 Pedro Pascal as Din Djarin / The Mandalorian: A Mandalorian bounty hunter whom Fett and Shand previously assisted in his quest.

Recurring co-stars 

 Matt Berry as the voice of 8D8: A torture droid in Fett's service. 
 David Pasquesi as the Twi'lek majordomo to Mok Shaiz, Mayor of Mos Espa on Tatooine 
 Jennifer Beals as Garsa Fwip: A Twi'lek who runs a cantina in Mos Espa called the Sanctuary. 
 Carey Jones as Krrsantan: A Wookiee bounty hunter, and former gladiator, who worked for the Twins, Jabba the Hutt's cousins, before being hired by Fett.
 Sophie Thatcher as Drash: Leader of a group of cyborgs who work for Boba Fett. 
 Jordan Bolger as Skad: A member of the group of cyborgs who work for Fett.

Other co-stars 
 Stephen Root as Lortha Peel: A water-monger in the Worker's District of Mos Espa. 
 Danny Trejo as the rancor trainer of Fett's rancor.
 Stephen "Thundercat" Bruner as a mod artist in Mos Eisley who saves the lives of Shand and Vanth using cybernetic parts. 
 Emily Swallow as the Armorer: Leader of Djarin's former Mandalorian warrior tribe.
 Amy Sedaris as Peli Motto: A mechanic who runs a hangar in Mos Eisley. 
 Timothy Olyphant as Cobb Vanth: The marshal of the Tatooine town of Freetown, formerly Mos Pelgo, who wore the armor of Boba Fett
 Rosario Dawson as Ahsoka Tano: A Togruta and former Jedi Padawan to Anakin Skywalker.
 Corey Burton as the voice of Cad Bane: A notorious Duros bounty hunter employed by the Pyke Syndicate. Bane is physically portrayed by Dorian Kingi.
 Mark Hamill as Luke Skywalker: A Jedi Master and the son of Anakin Skywalker and Padmè Amidala. As with his  appearance on The Mandalorian, Skywalker was largely created through visual effects and synthesized speech based on reference images and recordings, respectively, of Hamill. Graham Hamilton was the on-set performer for the character.

Additionally, director Robert Rodriguez voices the Trandoshan crime boss Dokk Strassi (physically portrayed by Stephen Oyoung), and the Ithorian Mayor of Mos Espa, Mok Shaiz. Frank Trigg and Collin Hymes portray the two Gamorrean guards in Fett's service. Mandy Kowalski and Skyler Bible appear as Camie Marstrap and Laze "Fixer" Loneozner, respectively, characters originally portrayed by Koo Stark and Anthony Forrest in a deleted scene from Star Wars (1977). Paul Sun-Hyung Lee and Jon Favreau both reprise their Mandalorian roles as Captain Carson Teva and the voice of Paz Vizsla, respectively, with Vizsla portrayed by Tait Fletcher. Max Lloyd-Jones, who served as the Luke Skywalker stand-in on The Mandalorian, appears as Lieutenant Reed. W. Earl Brown also reprises his role as Taanti, the Weequay proprietor in Freetown. Also returning from The Mandalorian is the character Grogu, a young Force-sensitive member of Yoda's species who was previously guarded by Djarin. Skywalker's droid R2-D2 also appears.

Sam Witwer, the voice actor for Darth Maul in previous Star Wars media, provides the uncredited voice of a Rodian prisoner, while frequent Star Wars voice actor Stephen Stanton provides the uncredited voice of a Pyke traveler with Alfred Hsing performing on set. Phil LaMarr provides the voice for the Pyke and Klatooinian bosses, and Will Kirby makes a cameo appearance as Karales, a former bounty hunter at the Sanctuary.

Episodes

Production

Background 
In February 2013, Disney CEO Bob Iger announced the development of several Star Wars standalone spin-off films. One was reportedly centered on the bounty hunter character Boba Fett, and would either take place between Star Wars (1977) and The Empire Strikes Back (1980) or The Empire Strikes Back and Return of the Jedi (1983). The film was also said to explore the other bounty hunters seen in The Empire Strikes Back. In early 2014, Simon Kinberg approached director Josh Trank about making a Star Wars film, and Trank made a pitch for a Boba Fett film to Star Wars producer Lucasfilm; he was hired to direct that June. Trank was scheduled to announce the film at Star Wars Celebration Anaheim in April 2015, and also reveal a teaser for the project, but this was canceled at the last minute after Lucasfilm became aware of the troubled production on Trank's film Fantastic Four (2015). By May 2015, Trank was no longer working on the film. A Boba Fett film was reportedly still being considered by Lucasfilm as of August 2017. Following the financial failure of the film Solo: A Star Wars Story (2018), Disney reconsidered their Star Wars film output. By October 2018, the Boba Fett film was no longer moving forward, and Lucasfilm was prioritizing the Disney+ streaming series The Mandalorian instead.

Iger said in February 2020 that spin-offs of The Mandalorian were being considered, and there was potential to add more characters to the series with the intention of then giving them their own series. In May, Temuera Morrison was set to appear as Boba Fett in the second season of The Mandalorian. Morrison portrayed Boba's father Jango Fett in Star Wars: Episode II – Attack of the Clones (2002) and went on to provide the voice of Boba in various Star Wars media. Before Morrison's involvement in The Mandalorian was confirmed, Fett briefly appeared in the first season episode "Chapter 5: The Gunslinger" alongside the character Fennec Shand, portrayed by Ming-Na Wen. Morrison has a brief role in the second-season premiere, "Chapter 9: The Marshal", before being fully introduced in "Chapter 14: The Tragedy", directed by Robert Rodriguez.

Development 
By early November 2020, production on either the third season of The Mandalorian or a potential spin-off series focusing on Boba Fett was believed to be scheduled to begin later that month or in early December. A Boba Fett spin-off series was not announced by Lucasfilm president Kathleen Kennedy at Disney's Investor Day event on December 10, when The Mandalorian spin-offs Rangers of the New Republic and Ahsoka were announced; Kennedy said those series exist within The Mandalorians timeline and were planned to culminate in a "climactic story event". Kennedy did announce that the "next chapter" of The Mandalorian story would premiere in December 2021.

The Mandalorians second-season finale, "Chapter 16: The Rescue", was released later in December 2020. It includes a "surprise end-credit sequence" that revealed The Book of Boba Fett was coming in December 2021. This led to some confusion and speculation among commentators who believed this was a subtitle for the third season of The Mandalorian, and that The Mandalorian would be switching focus from its title character Din Djarin to Boba Fett with the third season. Jon Favreau, The Mandalorians creator and showrunner, soon clarified that The Book of Boba Fett was its own series separate from the third season of The Mandalorian. He explained that the spin-off was not announced by Kennedy at the Investor Day event because they did not want to "spoil the surprise" of the reveal at the end of "Chapter 16: The Rescue". He added that production had already begun on the spin-off. It is executive produced by Favreau, Dave Filoni, and Rodriguez, with Favreau writing all seven episodes of the series and co-writing the sixth with Filoni. Like the other spin-offs, The Book of Boba Fett is also set within the timeline of The Mandalorian, and has been described as "The Mandalorian season 2.5". The production referred to each episode of The Book of Boba Fett as if it was a third season of The Mandalorian; for example, the first episode was referred to as "301" rather than the typical "101" for a series' first episode. The series consists of seven episodes.

Casting 
When production on the series was first reported, Sophie Thatcher was said to be joining the Mandalorian franchise but it was unknown in which series she would appear. With the series' official announcement in December 2020, Temuera Morrison and Ming-Na Wen were confirmed to be reprising their respective roles of Boba Fett and Fennec Shand from The Mandalorian and other previous Star Wars media. Before then, Wen assumed that she was hired as a series regular for the third season of The Mandalorian. Jennifer Beals was revealed to have a role in the series in November 2021, and Thatcher was confirmed to be appearing in this series in January 2022. The character Krrsantan, a Wookiee bounty hunter introduced in Marvel Comics' Star Wars comic books, also appears in the series, portrayed by Carey Jones, while Corey Burton reprises his role as the voice of Cad Bane from the animated series The Clone Wars and The Bad Batch for the character's live-action debut.

Additional characters from The Mandalorian appear, including Pedro Pascal as Din Djarin / The Mandalorian, Emily Swallow as the Armorer, Amy Sedaris as Peli Motto, Favreau as the voice of Paz Vizsla, Paul Sun-Hyung Lee as Carson Teva, Timothy Olyphant as Cobb Vanth, Grogu, Rosario Dawson as Ahsoka Tano, Mark Hamill as Luke Skywalker, and W. Earl Brown as the Weequay bartender.

Filming 
Filming for the series began by late November 2020, under the working title Buccaneer, on the StageCraft video wall volume in Los Angeles that is also used for The Mandalorian. COVID-19 safety guidelines were followed on set, with crew members wearing masks and face shields around actors, rapid testing for COVID-19 every three days, and normal testing for the virus once a week. After two weeks of filming, members of the cast and crew learned that they were making The Book of Boba Fett rather than The Mandalorian season three. Rodriguez directed three episodes of the series, with Steph Green, Kevin Tancharoen, Bryce Dallas Howard, and Filoni also directing an episode each. Dean Cundey, David Klein, and Paul Hughen served as cinematographers on the series. Filming wrapped by June 8, 2021, with the Obi-Wan Kenobi series taking over the Los Angeles soundstages.

Visual effects 
Industrial Light & Magic, Ghost VFX, Important Looking Pirates, Hybride, and SSVFX provide visual effects for the series.

Music 
By late September 2021, scoring sessions for the series had begun with The Mandalorian composer Ludwig Göransson returning for The Book of Boba Fett. Joseph Shirley, who provided additional music on The Mandalorian, was also involved and was expected to receive composer credit. Göransson is credited as having composed the main themes for the series, with Shirley credited as composer. Walt Disney Records released Göransson's main theme for the series as a digital single on December 28, 2021, and Swedish media commented on the similarity between the theme and Björn Isfält's music for the film Ronia, the Robber's Daughter (1984). Shirley's score was released in two volumes: music from "Chapter 1" through "Chapter 4" was released on January 21, 2022, and a second soundtrack for "Chapter 5" through "Chapter 7" was released on February 11.

Release 
The series premiered on Disney+ on December 29, 2021, and consists of seven episodes that were released weekly until February 9, 2022.

Reception

Audience viewership 
According to Whip Media, The Book of Boba Fett was the most anticipated new television series of December 2021. According to Samba TV, 1.7 million US households watched the debut of The Book of Boba Fett in its first 5 days following its December 29, 2021, release. The season finale had the highest viewership of a Star Wars Disney+ series to date, with Deadline Hollywood reporting that the finale was viewed by 1.5 million, 36% more than The Mandalorian season 2 finale. According to Whip Media, The Book of Boba Fett was the most watched original series across all platforms in the United States, during the week January 16, 2022, as well and during the week of February 6, 2022. According to the streaming aggregator JustWatch, The Book of Boba Fett was the 4th most streamed television series across all platforms in the United States, during the week ending February 13, 2022.

Critical response 

Review aggregator Rotten Tomatoes reported an approval rating of 66% based on 200 reviews, with an average rating of 6.8/10, with the critical consensus stating: "The Book of Boba Fett could never match the adventures that existed in fans' imaginations for decades, but it earns its commission with spectacular set pieces and Temuera Morrison's commanding presence." Metacritic gave the series a weighted average score of 59 out of 100 based on 19 critics, indicating "mixed or average reviews".

Daniel D'Addario of Variety praised the narrative, visuals, and performances. Polygons David Grossman said that the first episode showed the "desperate side of Star Wars". Maggie Lovitt at Collider expressed that the second episode "delivered one of the best and most thematically rich episodes of Star Wars television to date". Hannah Flint of IGN stated that without Morrison portraying Fett the show might have been a total failure, saying, "Morrison's plain-speaking, humane antihero keeps you endeared to Boba's story". NMEs Jesse Hassenger said the show was really "season 2.5 of The Mandalorian" and that it "had a baffling structure, with poorly integrated flashbacks that halted abruptly halfway through the season and an equally sudden swerve away from Boba Fett himself shortly thereafter." Nick Wanserski of The A.V. Club said that the show was "very watchable", but that it ended the same way it started: "a mess". The Ringer staff opined that excluding Fett from the series' penultimate two episodes negatively impacted the finale, with general praise for the tie-in to The Mandalorian (including Grogu's appearance) and Cad Bane's live-action debut (excluding his death); some opined that Fett is better in a supporting role.

Wanserski also said that the train heist scene was "rad", while Rohan Nahaar of The Indian Express criticized it. Flint stated that the decision to kill off the Tuskens was an "obvious and lazy one". The cyborg gang was negatively compared to the Power Rangers. The digitally  Luke was considered an improvement from his appearance in The Mandalorian, but some considered the special effect off-putting.

Accolades

Documentary series 
In April 2022, a Disney Gallery episode for the series was announced, which was released on May 4, 2022.

Notes

References

External links
 
 
 
 
 The Book of Boba Fett on StarWars.com

2020s American science fiction television series
2021 American television series debuts
American action adventure television series
American television spin-offs
Disney+ original programming
English-language television shows
Fiction set on desert planets
Interquel television series
Primetime Emmy Award-winning television series
Productions using StageCraft
Space adventure television series
Space opera television series
Space Western television series
Star Wars television series
Television series created by Jon Favreau
Television series by Lucasfilm
Television shows directed by Steph Green
Television shows filmed in California
Television shows filmed in Los Angeles
Television shows scored by Ludwig Göransson
 
The Mandalorian